Binita Toppo, (born 21 November 1980) is a member of the India women's national field hockey team. She played with the team when it won the Gold at the 2004 Women's Hockey Asia Cup. Toppo is currently employed with Western Railways.

Early life
Toppo was born in Lulkidihi in the Sundergarh district of Odisha. She lost her father at a very young age and her mother worked at a school as a cleaner.

Education
Toppo studied at the Mahindra College in Ranchi. She trained at the Panposh Sports Hostel, Rourkela. Toppo completed coaches’ training programs at Tata Football Academy, Jamshedpur and Baichung Bhutia Football Schools, Delhi.

Career and training
Toppo made it to the Indian National team in 2004. Prior to that, she had won many local tournaments in the state. She led the Indian women's hockey team in the 2007 Women's Asia Cup. She led the U-16 Jharkhand state team along with studying at school. She ranked position 5 in Common Wealth Sport in the year 2010.

Toppo played at the full back position in the Indian women's hockey team in the domestic circuit.

In the international circuit, Toppo played 
 Asian Games in Doha in December 2006
 Asia Cup in Delhi in February 2004
 Indira Gandhi Gold Cup in Delhi in October 2005
 Asian Tour, a four nation tournament in Singapore in August 2004. 
 Australian Tour, 3 nation series in April 2004
Toppo also represented India in the 2006 World Cup in Madrid.

Recognition 
In May 2011, Toppo was felicitated by the then chief minister Naveen Patnaik at Jaydev Bhawan, Bhubaneshwar for her contributions to Indian hockey.

References 

Asian Games bronze medalists for India
Sportswomen from Odisha
21st-century Indian women
21st-century Indian people
Medalists at the 2006 Asian Games
1980 births
Living people
Field hockey players from Odisha
Indian female field hockey players
Asian Games medalists in field hockey
People from Odisha
Field hockey players at the 2006 Asian Games
Field hockey players at the 2010 Asian Games
Field hockey players at the 2010 Commonwealth Games
Commonwealth Games competitors for India